Stepan Andrianovich Kalinin (28 December 1890 – 11 September 1975) was a Soviet army commander. He fought in the Imperial Russian Army during World War I before going over to the Bolsheviks during the subsequent civil war. He was promoted to Komkor (corps commander) in 1938. He was a member of the Communist Party of the Soviet Union. He was a recipient of the Order of Lenin and the Order of the Red Banner. He retired at the age of 56.

Sources and external links
 Выступление С. А. Калинина на совещании высшего командного состава Красной Армии в декабре 1940 года
 Статья о С. А. Калинине «Судьба командарма-24» 
 Коллектив авторов. «Великая Отечественная. Командармы. Военный биографический словарь» — М.; Жуковский: Кучково поле, 2005. 
 Сборник. Командный и начальствующий состав Красной Армии в 1940—1941 гг. Структура и кадры центрального аппарата НКО СССР, военных округов и общевойсковых армий. Документы и материалы. М.;СПб.:Летний сад, 2005.
 Калинин Степан Андрианович
 Фото http://voenspez.ru/index.php?topic=11202.20

Sources
 

1890 births
1975 deaths
People from Yegoryevsky District, Moscow Oblast
People from Bogorodsky Uyezd
Communist Party of the Soviet Union members
First convocation members of the Verkhovna Rada of the Ukrainian Soviet Socialist Republic
Soviet lieutenant generals
Russian military personnel of World War I
Soviet military personnel of the Russian Civil War
Soviet military personnel of World War II
Recipients of the Order of Lenin
Recipients of the Order of the Red Banner
Gulag detainees
Soviet rehabilitations